Joanna Kerns is an American actress and director best known for her role as Maggie Seaver on the family situation comedy Growing Pains from 1985 to 1992.

Early life
Kerns was born Joanna Crussie DeVarona in San Francisco, California. Her father, David Thomas DeVarona, was an insurance agent, and her mother, Martha Louise (née Smith), was a clothing store manager. Kerns is the third child of four.  She has an older brother and a younger brother, as well as an older sister. Her older sister, Donna de Varona, is an Olympic gold medal swimmer, winning two gold medals in the 1964 Olympics. Their aunt was silent film actress Miriam Cooper. 

Growing up, Kerns was constantly in competition with Donna. Kerns stated in an interview, "Donna was the golden girl. There was pressure inside me to duplicate Donna's success". Joanna tried swimming, but realized it was not her sport, so she switched to gymnastics. She competed in the Olympic trials in 1968 and ranked 14th out of 28.

Career

Early roles
Kerns got her start in show business as a dancer before turning to acting. She attended UCLA and majored in dance.  There, she saw an advertisement for a Gene Kelly production called Clown Around and immediately jumped at the chance to audition. She joked in an interview that she sent the casting crew a high school senior picture of herself and all of her grades, hoping to get the part. To take the part, however, she would have to drop out of college and move to New York, so she did. After Clown Around, Joanna also got parts in the New York Shakespeare Festival's production of Two Gentlemen of Verona and Ulysses in Nighttown, where she was directed by Burgess Meredith.

Meredith and Kerns had a wonderful working relationship. Later in life, Kerns recalled that Meredith was a great influence on her, saying, "Burgess was the one person who really influenced my acting career". Meredith  also introduced Kerns to Peggy Feury, under whom Kerns studied acting. In 1972, she moved back to California and landed a job as a backup dancer at Disneyland, and started auditioning for TV commercials and steady acting jobs.

On May 4, 1977, she made an appearance on Charlie's Angels as Natalie, a worker at a massage parlor in the episode "The Blue Angels".

During the late 1970s and early 1980s, Kerns started making a name for herself in guest spots on many televisions shows that included: Emergency!, CHiPs, The A-Team, Starsky & Hutch, Street Hawk, Laverne and Shirley, Three's Company, Hill Street Blues, The Love Boat, Hunter, Quincy, M.E., Magnum, P.I., and V, as well as many commercials. During an interview, Kerns said, "I kind of was always looking for the next thing; I auditioned for anything, hoping to get a big break" (Lifetime's Intimate Portrait). Then, Kerns got her first steady acting job in 1983, starring as Pat Devon in a new CBS series called The Four Seasons, which lasted only one season. The sitcom, which was based on a 1981 movie of the same name, was about three couples who all lived under the same roof in California. Although the show was not well received by television critics, her part proved to producers that she was capable of acting as a leading lady.

Growing Pains
Soon after the cancellation of The Four Seasons, Kerns auditioned for a new series in late 1984, called Growing Pains. She auditioned with Alan Thicke, who was just coming off the failure of his TV talk show Thicke of the Night. Kerns joked in many interviews that Alan and she had immediate chemistry, especially when she kissed him on his nose by accident during their audition together. Kerns and Thicke's chemistry won them both the parts, and the two became great friends off the show.

During the success of Growing Pains, Kerns began to star in television movies, where she played controversial parts very different from the beloved all-American mom, Maggie Seaver. One such performance that shocked audiences was her 1992 movie, The Nightman, in which Kerns played a highly sexual business woman who was a motel owner. Her many TV movies include: Those She Left Behind, Blind Faith, The Big One: The Great Los Angeles Earthquake, Shameful Secrets, and No One Could Protect Her.

After Growing Pains roles and directing career
After Growing Pains ended, Kerns turned to directing. She directed one episode of Growing Pains while starring on the show and got hooked. In an interview, Kerns stated, "Directing is where I've always wanted to go". She loved directing and decided to change the focus of her career from acting to directing, while continuing to make rare appearances in front of the camera when the right parts come along. She has also directed episodes of television shows including Dawson's Creek, Titans, Scrubs, Private Practice,  Psych, Felicity, Grey's Anatomy, Privileged, ER, Ghost Whisperer, Army Wives, Pretty Little Liars, Switched at Birth, The Goldbergs, This Is Us, and Fuller House. Kerns also directed Annie Potts in an original made-for-television movie for Lifetime TV entitled: Defending Our Kids: The Julie Posey Story. She has since made a number of shorts, and directed the sixth episode of Pitch, a sports drama on Fox.

Kerns has also made notable appearances in feature films, including A*P*E, Girl, Interrupted, and the 2007 comedy Knocked Up.

She has also co-founded the Women in Film Crystal + Lucy Awards given to women in acting.

Kerns was a member of the Motion Picture and Television Fund Board of Trustees from 2004 through 2008.

Personal life
In 1974, Kerns met a commercial producer, Richard Kerns, on the set of a commercial, and they married two years later. Their marriage lasted nine years and the couple had a daughter, Ashley Cooper. In 1994 Kerns married Marc Appleton, a prominent Los Angeles architect. In August 2019, Kerns filed for divorce from Appleton.  

Kerns dated comedian and actor Freddie Prinze a short time before he died of a self-inflicted gunshot wound.  The two had worked together on the 1976 TV movie, The Million Dollar Rip-Off.

Politics
Kerns, a registered Democrat, supported John Kerry in the 2004 United States Presidential Election and Hillary Clinton in the 2016 United States Presidential Election.

Filmography

Director

References

External links
 
 

20th-century American actresses
21st-century American actresses
Actresses from California
American film actresses
American television actresses
American television directors
American women film directors
American women television directors
California Democrats
Hispanic and Latino American actresses
Living people
Film directors from California
Actresses from San Francisco
Year of birth missing (living people)